Frankenia capitata is a species of flowering plant in the family Fabaceae, native to southern Macaronesia (the Canary Islands, Madeira and the Salvage Islands).

References

Frankenia
Flora of the Canary Islands
Flora of Madeira
Flora of the Savage Islands